is a railway station in Yaizu, Shizuoka Prefecture, Japan, operated by Central Japan Railway Company (JR Tōkai).

Lines
Nishi-Yaizu Station is served by the Tōkaidō Main Line, and is located 197.0 kilometers from the starting point of the line at Tokyo Station.

Station layout
The station has two opposing side platforms serving Track 1 and Track 2. The platforms are connected to the station building by an overpass. The station building has automated ticket machines, TOICA automated turnstiles and a staffed ticket office.

Platforms

Adjacent stations

|-
!colspan=5|Central Japan Railway Company

Station history
Nishi-Yaizu Station was opened on March 21, 1987 in response to requests from the local Yaizu city government. It is primary a commuter station, serving an industrial zone.

Station numbering was introduced to the section of the Tōkaidō Line operated JR Central in March 2018; Nishi-Yaizu Station was assigned station number CA21.

Passenger statistics
In fiscal 2017, the station was used by an average of 6,096 passengers daily (boarding passengers only).

Surrounding area
Yaizu Chuo High School

See also
 List of Railway Stations in Japan

References

Yoshikawa, Fumio. Tokaido-sen 130-nen no ayumi. Grand-Prix Publishing (2002) .

External links

  

Railway stations in Japan opened in 1987
Railway stations in Shizuoka Prefecture
Tōkaidō Main Line
Stations of Central Japan Railway Company
Yaizu, Shizuoka